J.A. Redmerski (born November 25, 1975) is an American New York Times, Wall Street Journal and USA Today Bestseller List novelist. Her book The Edge of Never was initially self-published in 2012, but was re-released in 2013 through Forever Romance/Grand Central Publishing.

Bibliography
 Dirty Eden (2012)
 Song of the Fireflies (2014)
 The Moment Of Letting Go (2015)
 Everything Under The Sun (2017/2021)
 "The Waltz of Devil's Creek" (2020)
 "Silver Dawn Afire (The Seventh Age Saga" Book 1) (2021)
 "Allister Boone" (2019)

The Darkwoods Trilogy
The Mayfair Moon (2012)
Kindred (2012)
The Ballad of Aramei (2012)

The Edge of Never
 The Edge of Never (2013)  
 The Edge of Always (2013)
 The Edge of Destiny (Date currently unknown)

In the Company of Killers
 Killing Sarai (2013)
 Reviving Izabel (2013)
 The Swan & the Jackal (2014)
 Seeds of Iniquity (2014)
 The Black Wolf (2015)
 Behind the Hands that Kill (2016)
 Spiders in the Grove (2018)
 The Darkest Half  (2022)

References

External links
 

Living people
1975 births
American women novelists
21st-century American novelists
21st-century American women writers